Pabstiella deltoglossa is a species of orchid plant native to Brazil .

References 

deltoglossa
Flora of Brazil
Taxa named by Alfred Cogniaux